Moscow Cinema ( Moskva kinotatron), is a cinema hall in the Armenian capital Yerevan, located at the Charles Aznavour Square, adjacent to Abovyan Street.

History and structure
The cinema was opened in 1936 on the site of Saint Paul and Peter Church, which was demolished in the 1930s by the Soviet authorities. The building was designed by architects Tiran Terkanyan and Gevork Kochar. The theatre was opened on 12 December 1936 with its first ever show of the Soviet-Armenian movie Pepo. 

In 1960, the building was redesigned by architects Gevork Kochar and Telman Gevorkyan. In 1983, the building was redeveloped when the facade was decorated with scenes of many famous Soviet-Armenian movies including Chabayev, Pepo, David Bek and Sayat Nova. 

The cinema was privatized in 1999. Following a major renovation, the cinema was reopened in September 2000.

Moscow Cinema is the main venue of the Golden Apricot Yerevan International Film Festival, an international film festival held in Yerevan every year since 2004. The square in front of the cinema is named after Charles Aznavour as part of the celebrations of the 10th anniversary of Armenian independence in 2001.

Currently, Moscow cinema has 4 theatre halls: the red hall with 491 seats, the blue hall with 350 seats, the small red hall with 49 seats and the gallery with 35 seats. The cinema has also an open-air theatre located at the eastern side of the building.

See also

 Armenian National Cinematheque
 Cinema of Armenia

External links
 Review of Moscow Cinema
 About Moscow Cinema

References

Cinemas and movie theaters in Armenia
Theatres in Armenia
Movie palaces
Event venues established in 1936
Buildings and structures in Yerevan
Tourist attractions in Yerevan